Gerrit Lambrechts (c. 1666 – September 1705 (buried on 20 September 1705)) was a Flemish-born Dutch engraver and draftsman. He was born in Antwerp but moved to Amsterdam in the 1680s. He was active there from 1687 until 1705, the year of his death.

Biography
He was born in Antwerp, in the Southern Netherlands, around 1666. It has been established that in 1687 he was active in Amsterdam, Dutch Republic. He was an etcher, copperplate engraver, draughtsman, and playing-card maker. He married in Amsterdam, and was active there until 1705, the year of his death. 

He died in Amsterdam on 20 September 1705. ECARTICO reports that Lambrechts was a Roman Catholic.

Family
He married Annetje Barents van der Sluijs (1667 - ?) in Amsterdam on 10 October 1687.

Bibliography
 Thieme, Ulrich; Becker, Felix, Allgemeines Lexikon der bildenden Künstler : von der Antike bis zur Gegenwart, Leipzig : Seemann, 1907-1950
 Waller, F.G.; Juynboll, Willem R. (bew.), Biographisch woordenboek van Noord Nederlandsche graveurs [Waller] [herdruk 1974], Amsterdam : Israël, 1974

Sources
 Stadsarchief Amsterdam, Amsterdam: DTB-registers (toegangsnummer 5001), 367: 33, 367: 64, 367: 90, 368: 7, 368: 17, 516: 283, 1230: 408, 1230: 408 & 1251: 273
 Stadsarchief Amsterdam, Amsterdam: Archief van de Notarissen ter standplaats Amsterdam (toegangsnummer 5075), 11073: 194809 (Aktenummer)
 Beyer, Andreas, Savoy, Bénédicte & Tegethoff, Wolf (eds.) Allgemeines Künstlerlexikon Online / Artists of the World Online, s.p.: De Gruyter Saur (s.a.)
 Waller, F.G., Biographisch woordenboek van Noord Nederlandsche graveurs, 's-Gravenhage: Martinus Nijhoff (1938).

References

External links
 Lambrechts at VIAF
 Lambrechts at Biografisch Portaal
 Lambrechts at RKD
 Lambrechts at ECARTICO

1666 births
1705 deaths
Engravers from Amsterdam
Flemish engravers
Dutch printmakers
Dutch draughtsmen
Artists from Antwerp